Erica Hahn, M.D., F.A.C.S is a fictional character from the American Broadcasting Company (ABC) medical drama television series Grey's Anatomy, portrayed by actress Brooke Smith. Hahn was a recurring character through the show's second and third seasons, and joined the main cast in the fourth season. Prior to assuming the role, Smith observed heart surgery being performed, and admitted to finding stressful the pressure of continually portraying a medical professional realistically.

The character is presented as highly professional, to the point of being a "workaholic". She is notably hard on Resident Cristina Yang (Sandra Oh), admitting that Cristina reminds her of herself as a student. Despite her intentions to keep away from relationships, she becomes romantically involved with orthopedic surgeon Callie Torres (Sara Ramirez). The storyline was praised for its realistic portrayal of a developing same-sex relationship between two women, although consultants from the Gay & Lesbian Alliance Against Defamation expressed some concerns over what they deemed the somewhat exploitative talk of a threesome between Hahn, Torres and Mark Sloan. Hahn was written out of Grey's Anatomy in November 2008, with Smith commenting that the decision originated with the ABC network rather than with series creator Shonda Rhimes.

Storylines 

Upon her first appearance in the series it is established that Hahn is a long-time rival of main character and fellow cardiothoracic surgeon Preston Burke, dating back to their days at Johns Hopkins University School of Medicine, where she graduated second after Burke. She is introduced as a cardiothoracic attending surgeon at Seattle Presbyterian Hospital when she and Burke fight over a donor heart.  Hahn reappears in season three when she is contacted by George O'Malley (T.R. Knight) for a consult on his father's valve replacement after George finds out about Burke's hand tremors and Cristina helping him cover it up. Hahn transfers to Seattle Grace Hospital in the season four episode, "Haunt You Everyday", after performing a successful heart transplant at the request of the Chief of Surgery, Richard Webber.  She takes on the role previously held by Burke, Seattle Grace's Head of Cardiothoracic Surgery. Hahn cultivates an antagonistic relationship with Burke's former protégée Cristina Yang, refusing to let her scrub in on surgeries, and constantly criticizing her overly enthusiastic behavior. She later confesses to Addison Montgomery (Kate Walsh) that she is purposely hard on Cristina, as she reminds her of herself as a Resident.

The character deflects the romantic attention of fellow attending Mark Sloan, admitting that she finds him attractive but wishes to keep her private life separate from her working life. She also develops a friendship with Callie Torres which becomes temporarily strained when Callie is led to believe Hahn has romantic designs on her. Although Hahn laughs off the notion, she goes on to kiss Callie in front of Sloan, to prove that he couldn't handle a threesome with the two of them, leaving Callie stunned. In the season four finale, Callie initiates a second passionate kiss, which Hahn reciprocates. The two attempt a romantic relationship, but while Erica comes to terms with her sexuality quickly, Callie is slightly confused because it doesn't feel right doing it with Hahn so she quickly goes and sleeps with Sloan to learn how to sleep with Hahn.

Development

Casting and creation 
Erica Hahn was initially conceived as a minor character, and occasional guest-star rival of Preston Burke (Isaiah Washington). The character first appeared in three episodes of the show's second season, followed by another two episodes of the show's third season. Discussing whether she thought Hahn might become a main character after her season three appearance, Smith has stated that at the time: "I didn't really think it was going to work out", joking that "After every time I would hope that they would call and also hope not too – kind of like when I used to be single." However, following Washington's departure from the show, Hahn was brought back as a main character in the show's fourth season, replacing Burke as Seattle Grace's Head of Cardiothoracic Surgery. Smith has said that she was not expecting her character to be introduced to the show full-time, as she "didn't want to be disappointed if it didn't happen." She has stated that a deciding factor in her return was the opportunity it presented to explore the character in greater depth, explaining: "When I work on something that has a beginning, middle and end, I can create an arc. With Dr. Hahn, I need to figure out who she is". Researching the role, Smith watched a heart surgery performed, and liaised with the surgical nurses employed by Grey's Anatomy producers to maintain realism in the show's operating room. She dubbed this research stressful, stating that "I got very neurotic about the fact that I didn’t go to medical school. I’m not actually a doctor", explaining; "I have no idea what it really is to be a surgeon and yet I have to act like I am really good at it. I have to look like I’ve been doing it a long time".

On November 3, 2008, it was reported by Entertainment Weekly's Michael Ausiello that Erica would depart from Grey's Anatomy on November 6. Series creator Shonda Rhimes issued the statement that:

E! Online's Kristin Dos Santos reported that Smith's dismissal from the show was enforced by the ABC network, as part of an attempt to "de-gay" Grey's Anatomy. She revealed that as well as writing out the character Erica Hahn, Grey's Anatomy newcomer Melissa George would no longer be playing a bisexual character as announced. Brooke Smith, interviewed by Michael Ausiello, stated that:

Smith explained that the script for her final episode did not involve her character being written out, and that Erica's final scene on the show is "just [her] heading to [her] car." She agreed with the assessment that her dismissal originated from ABC and not Shonda Rhimes herself, stating: "it definitely seemed like [Shonda's] hands were tied." Rhimes also said: "We didn't have a controversy with Dr. Hahn. The press created a whole thing that had nothing to do with reality."

Characterization 
Describing her character's personality, Smith has stated: "Dr. Hahn is a workaholic and she's very professional [...] I think she feels that there should be professionalism at work, and when other people do things that aren't professional she gets a little upset.", adding: "She has little rules in her head about how you’re supposed to act at work. That doesn’t mean she can’t break the rules. But everyone else is supposed to follow them." Stacy McKee, writer of season four episode "Kung Fu Fighting", which saw the establishment of Hahn as a main character, has deemed her: "hardcore. [...] a kick ass female surgeon". Smith has explained that the show's writers "didn’t want to rush to make [Hahn] likable, and hoped I didn’t mind. A lot of actors don’t want to be unlikable, even if they’re the bad guy. But I’m okay with that — I’m good with being unlikable." Series creator Shonda Rhimes, discussing the rivalry between Hahn and her Resident Cristina Yang – which saw Hahn reprimanded by Richard Webber (James Pickens, Jr.), Seattle Grace's Chief of Surgery, for her lack of encouragement — has given the insight: "Hahn is a brilliant surgeon and is great with her patients but her teaching skills?  Well, let's just say she can use a little more loving care with her students, particularly Cristina. [...] I felt sorry for Hahn because Hahn grew up in a surgical world that included even fewer women than there is now (so Hahn is accustomed to a "dog eat dog" kind of surgical world)." Trish Doolan, who consulted with the show's producers on the developing lesbian storyline between Hahn and Callie Torres, said of the character: "She's very strong, very good at what she does, and actually a lot of men are threatened by that. She's very confident with what she does and who she is".

Initially upon her arrival at Seattle Grace, plastic surgeon Mark Sloan was seen to develop feelings for Hahn, only to be repeatedly rebuffed. The character explained that she kept her personal and professional lives separate, but as Smith has explained: "She came to the wrong hospital if she thought she wasn’t going to have a personal life!" Smith has admitted to eavesdropping on a writers’ meeting in an attempt to find out what was in store for her character romantically, as it was being closely guarded, even from her. She discussed with TV Guide editor Michael Ausiello early in her tenure as Hahn how she and Sandra Oh had pushed for a lesbian relationship between Hahn and Cristina, having previously played lovers in the play Stop Kiss. She agreed with Ausiello's assessment that Hahn would make an "awesome lesbian" and that: "I've certainly let [the producers] know I'm open to it. [...] They were like, "OK, duly noted!" I think they wanted me to shut up already." Equally, however, Smith has revealed that when she and Shonda Rhimes first discussed the possibility of Hahn being gay; ""we felt it was too obvious that a strong, powerful woman would be a lesbian".

Despite this assessment, the end of the show's fourth season saw Hahn grow closer to orthopedic surgeon Callie Torres, in a relationship dubbed "Eri-Cal" and later "Callica" by Entertainment Weekly. Rhimes has stated that: "Callie and Erica have an undeniable chemistry. And watching the story unfold is something the writers are looking forward to. I wanted to illuminate their relationship in the same way we do all relationships on the show — it will be funny, sweet, honest, and a little bit dirty." She has explained that in developing the relationship between the two: "we wanted it to be real – not some stunt to get people talking.  We wanted to see what would happen if a woman suddenly had feelings for another woman." The two characters shared a kiss at the end of season finale, with which After Ellen have noted: "Callie and Erica became the only regular lesbian/bisexual female characters currently on network television. This is also the first time that two regular characters on a network show have begun a lesbian romance, as opposed to one becoming involved with a new lesbian character introduced expressly for that relationship."

Before embarking on the storyline, the show's producers consulted with the Gay & Lesbian Alliance Against Defamation to ensure they maintained realism throughout. Trish Doolan, star of April's Shower was invited to consult in the workshop sessions which took place, and surmised that; "They were really wanting to be truthful to the two characters they're focusing on in the woman-woman relationship", with Nikki Weiss, who also consulted, adding: "they didn't want to stereotype anything, either, and write from a place where they didn't understand it. [...] I don't think they did it as a stunt to get people back to watching after the strike. I really think that they wanted to develop these two characters, and that you could see a closeness with them way before they ever decided any kind of — I think they just have a chemistry together, as actresses, too. And you could tell that in the room. They definitely have a chemistry."

Discussing her own reaction to the storyline, Smith has commented; "I was psyched. I thought it was a great idea." She revealed that the writers have not fully divulged Hahn's romantic backstory to her, explaining; "a lot of it is still vague. I mean, there's what the writers think and what I've sort of thought, and in my mind. Maybe I had a crush in high school or in college or something — there was something, but I don't think it's ever — I think it might be her first time." Continuing with this theme, Smith also spoke with Kristin Dos Santos for E! about her character's lack of definitive romantic history, jesting; "I'll look at the script next week and be like "Oh my God, I've been a lesbian for years and I didn't know." She also discussed the meetings with GLAAD she and Ramirez attended, and their impact on her portrayal of the storyline, explaining: "It was actually very helpful because they did talk about their own personal lives, and how, I guess if you're an open person, and life is change, then anything can happen. And it could really rock your world I imagine, if you all of a sudden thought that you might be in love with a woman and maybe you weren't before."

Following the announcement that Erica was being written out of Grey's Anatomy, Smith was asked whether she was happy with the direction the storyline had taken. She responded: "You know, I was starting to get there, yeah. I was personally a little impatient with the gay panic, but it was more Callie's thing anyway. I think Dr. Hahn was sort of figuring it out." She deemed the scene which saw Callie sleep with Mark as practice for sleeping with Erica "a little icky", adding: "If you're a woman, don't you know how to please yourself?"

Reception 
Mary Macnamara of the Los Angeles Times has praised the character highly, writing: "Hahn is a terrific character, sassy and professional, with an appropriately acerbic view of the various romantic shenanigans. She also seems to be a carefully considered stand-in for viewers choking on the soapy silt of last season, a way for the writers to move forward without messing with the hugely successful brand. (Don’t get too nervous, Brooke, but the future of TV's once highest-rated drama may be in your hands.)" Discussing the character in terms of her relationship with Callie Torres, AfterEllen.com were also largely positive, assessing that: "The story line offered both the drama Grey's is known for and — despite some marginally exploitative threesome talk — a truthfulness network television has rarely achieved when it comes to lesbian relationships." Trish Doolan and Nikki Weiss, invited by GLAAD to consult with Grey's Anatomy producers on the storyline, praised the effort put into researching the issue by the writers and actors involved, though were more negative on the scene which saw Hahn kiss Callie in an elevator in front of Mark Sloan. Weiss commented: "I just felt like, if they really cared about each other, I don't think they would do that as a stunt. That seemed a little, I don't know, forced. [...] [It] was more like a conquest, like he could have [Erica] too or something." AfterEllen.com agreed with this view, criticizing the way the scene was edited so as to keep cutting to Mark's point of view, as though "privileging the male gaze." Smith, however, has refuted this interpretation, stating that; "Frankly, when I played that scene, I played it as, "You think that if you walked in the room and we were together, we would just be on you, but we wouldn't." So that's why I kissed her. In that moment, I swear to God, when I was playing it, that's what I was thinking. You know there's a bit of a competition between all the guys in the boys club and my character anyway, so when that happened it was sort of like, "Oh yeah, you wouldn't be intimidated, uh huh. OK, well, check this out."

Following the announcement that the character had been written out of Grey's Anatomy, Mary Macnamara wrote a critical LA Times editorial on the decision. She deemed Smith's firing: "a grim reminder that certain prejudices are still ascendant in television", writing that "most gay characters are allowed to have sex on network television only if they are part of a single-episode story line, and all actively sexual lesbian characters must be sylphlike, gorgeous and preferably under 30." She went on to assess that: "Smith probably got the boot not because her character wasn't interesting enough or sympathetic enough but because she, especially when paired with Ramirez, just didn't fit the visual template of "Grey's" or indeed, of most of network television. She is a character actress, not a tabloid star. In other words, and they are words I deeply regret, Ramirez, with all her lipglossed lusciousness, may be beautiful enough to be bi, but Smith is not beautiful enough to be gay. At least not on network TV. Some ground, it would appear, is too calcified to be broken." After Ellen's Dorothy Snarker was similarly critical of the decision, explaining that: "Smith's dismissal means the loss of American broadcast TV's only lesbian/bisexual couple in primetime. It was also the first significant gay relationship portrayed on the hit ABC series. The handful of remaining lesbian/bisexual relationships on TV are on cable, premium channels and daytime television." Detailing the decision to also change a new character's orientation from bisexual to heterosexual, Snarker added: "Besides striking a serious blow for queer women's visibility on the small screen, the moves seem to signal a significant setback in the industry's acceptance of mainstream gay and lesbian storylines." She concluded that: "While Callie had fleeting moments of gay panic where she slept with friend and fellow surgeon Mark Sloan (Eric Dane), the interaction between the two women was both organic and romantic. Callie and Erica's relationship stood out as one of the few bright spots for lesbian and bisexual characters on primetime TV. Now it seems all we’re left with is taillights."

References 
Specific

General

External links 
Grey's Anatomy  at ABC.com

Grey's Anatomy characters
Fictional lesbians
Fictional surgeons
Television characters introduced in 2006
Fictional female doctors
Fictional cardiothoracic surgeons
Fictional LGBT characters in television
American female characters in television